The 1986 Giro di Lombardia was the 80th edition of the Giro di Lombardia cycle race and was held on 18 October 1986. The race started in Como and finished in Milan. The race was won by Gianbattista Baronchelli of the Del Tongo team.

General classification

References

1986
Giro di Lombardia
Giro di Lombardia
1986 Super Prestige Pernod International